Bangladesh–Turkey relations are the bilateral relations between Bangladesh and Turkey. Both countries are members of the Organisation of Islamic Cooperation. Turkey has an embassy in Dhaka and Bangladesh has an embassy in Ankara and a consulate in Istanbul.

History

Early 
The two countries have had diplomatic relationships for several centuries. Ottoman ports were establishing trade links with Bengal by the 1580s. The ancient shipbuilding industry at the Port of Chittagong provided for the entire fleet of Ottoman warships of the sultans in the 17th century. The renowned muslin trade in Bengal was also welcomed by the Ottomans, who used the material for their turbans.

Dr. Mukhtar Ahmed Ansari's All-India Medical Mission travelled to Constantinople in 1912 to provide medical aid to the Ottoman Empire during the Balkan Wars. One notable participant in the mission was the Bengali author Ismail Hossain Siraji. Bengali Muslims continued to express their support to the Ottomans during the Khilafat Movement.

Modern 
In 2016, the diplomatic relationship between two countries became complex when Bangladesh denounced Turkey's consecutive requests to free several Bangladeshi Jamaat-e-Islami leaders who have been convicted for war crimes during Bangladesh Liberation War by the International Crimes Tribunal in Bangladesh and eventually executed. Following the execution of the Jamaat leader Motiur Rahman Nizami, Turkey withdrew its ambassador to Bangladesh. However, after Bangladesh's condemnation of the coup d'état attempt to overthrow the Erdogan government, relations began to improve. Consequently, Ankara sent a new ambassador to Dhaka. After arrival, the new Turkish ambassador remarked, "Bangladesh had helped Turkey by expressing its support to Erdogan’s government after the failed coup attempt." The ambassador commented that the relations between the two countries have become normal. The ambassador also expressed Turkey's willingness in helping Bangladesh to control militancy in the country.

During the Rohingya crisis, where the Muslim Rohingyas were being expelled from Myanmar, Turkey donated millions of dollars to the government of Bangladesh in order to aid the Rohingyas who are settling in Chittagong. In September 2017, First Lady Emine Erdogan visited and helped provide relief in the shelters of the Rohingyas and promised more co-operation and aid to Bangladesh.

High level state visits 
Former Bangladeshi president Ziaur Rahman became the first Bangladeshi head of state to visit Ankara. In 1986, the then Turkish prime minister, Turgut Ozal paid a visit to Bangladesh. Turkish President Suleyman Demirel joined Nelson Mandela and Yasser Arafat at the silver jubilee celebrations of Bangladesh's independence in 1997. In 1998, the two countries co-founded the Developing 8 Countries group. Turkish president Abdullah Gul paid an official visit to Dhaka in 2010. Turkish Prime Minister Recep Tayyip Erdoğan paid a visit to Dhaka in 2010. Bangladeshi Prime Minister Sheikh Hasina paid an official visit to Ankara in 2012.

Defence cooperation 

In 2013, Turkey supplied Otokar Cobra light armored vehicles to the Bangladesh Army.

In June 2021, a turnkey 105 mm and 155 mm artillery sell  production line establishment agreement was signed between Bangladesh and Turkish company REPKON. With the  modern Free Flowforming (REPKON patented) technology and computerized machinery from REPKON, BOF will produce high-quality 105 mm and 155 mm artillery shells.  According to Uğur Cem Gürpınar, REPKON business development and corporate communications officer, "Bangladesh, like many friendly and allied countries, preferred REPKON because of its technology that is ahead of its competitors in the world".

On 29 June 2021, Government to Government (G2G) defence memorandum of understanding (MoU) signed between  Bangladesh and Turkey. According to İsmail Demir, president of Presidency of Defense Industries, the export agreement of various products of Roketsan has been signed with Bangladesh. Roketsan already delivered TRG-300 Tiger MLRS to the Bangladesh Army in June 2021 from a separate deal. Bangladesh is set to become one of the top defence equipment clients of Turkey in next few years.

Economic relations 
Bangladesh and Turkey are among each other's key trading partners. The bilateral trade between the two countries is worth more than $1 billion. Bangladeshi export items to Turkey have been dominated by apparel products. Since 2012, Bangladesh and Turkey have been in talks to sign a free trade agreement, but signing of the agreement is halted due to the complications relating to Turkey's bid for accession to the European Union. The shipbuilding industry of Bangladesh has also been identified as a potential sector for Turkish investment.

Bangladesh and Turkey have signed a joint protocol on trade and investment in 2012. The Bangladesh-Turkey Joint Economic Commission has been holding biennial meetings to discuss the ways for increasing bilateral trade and investment.

References 

 
Turkey
Bilateral relations of Turkey